Elections were held in Stormont, Dundas and Glengarry United Counties, Ontario on October 22, 2018 in conjunction with municipal elections across the province.

Stormont, Dundas and Glengarry United Counties Council
Council consists of the mayors and deputy mayors of each of the townships. It does not include the city of Cornwall.

North Dundas

Source:

North Glengarry

North Stormont

South Dundas

Source:

South Glengarry

South Stormont

Source:

References

Stormont
United Counties of Stormont, Dundas and Glengarry